Marios Vichos (born 14 January 2000) is a Greek professional footballer who plays as a left-back for Super League club Levadiakos.

Honours
Levadiakos
Super League 2: 2021–22

References

2000 births
Living people
Greek footballers
Super League Greece players
Gamma Ethniki players
Super League Greece 2 players
Levadiakos F.C. players
Association football defenders
Footballers from Central Greece
People from Phocis